The Danhai light rail (also known as Tamhai light rail) is a light rail transit (LRT) network in Tamsui District, New Taipei City, Taiwan. It opened on 23 December 2018 and began service the following day.

History
The system is built to provide public transportation to Danhai New Town, whose population is expected to reach 340,000 by 2041.

The initial feasibility study for a heavy-capacity extension line of the Taipei Metro was completed in 1992.  Further planning reports were completed in 1998 and 1999.  At that time the project was put on hold due to budgetary considerations.  In 2005, planning shifted from a metro system to a light rail system.  A light rail feasibility study was completed in 2007, with a review of funding and operation throughout 2008.  The study was completed and presented for approval to the Executive Yuan in 2010.

The light rail two-stage construction plan by the Ministry of Transportation and Communications was approved by Council for Economic Planning and Development  on 7 January 2013. The first phase of the construction began in September 2014.

The system is projected to carry 120,000 passengers per day.

Route

The system currently consists of 14 stations, with 6 additional stations planned.. Tracks are at ground level and elevated. The total length will be .

The Hongshulin–Kanding section opened in December 2018. Trains run from  Station northward and turn west along Zhongzheng East Road, Highway No. 2, Binhai Road and Shalun Road. Seven of its eleven stations are elevated, with the remaining four at ground level. The bike sharing service YouBike is available at seven stations.

A  branch with three stations opened in November 2020. The line follows Highway No. 2B, Binhai Road, and Shalun Road. All nine stations will be at ground level.

Stations

In operation
 Operation Services
 G1 - Bound for Kanding
 G2 - Bound for Tamsui Fisherman's Wharf

Under construction
Mackay Street was originally planned as 2 one-way stations, but now that plan has changed due to the strong opposition of the residents in Tamsui Old Street.

Rolling stock
The cars were built in Taiwan by the Taiwan Rolling Stock Company under the first program to domestically build light rail vehicles. The company partnered with the German firm Voith Engineering Services on the design of the cars. Final assembly and the manufacturing of many components were done in Taiwan. Through this project, Taiwan seeks to lessen its dependence on foreign manufacturers for rail systems.

They are designed with electrical onboard storage capacity so that they can travel short distances under their power; this feature allows simplification of the overhead power cabling by eliminating the need to run the power cables across major intersections. The prototype was scheduled to be ready in 2016, with all 15 cars to be delivered by the end of 2017.

Budget
The light rail was expected to cost NT$15.31 billion, in which NT$1.67 billion will be provided by the central government, NT$7.09 billion by Construction and Planning Agency and NT$6.55 billion by New Taipei City Government when it was approved in 2013. The current estimate is NT$31.357 billion.

Construction
The project is divided into two phases. The first phase is the 11-station Green Mountain Line and part of the Blue Coast Line comprising three stations, totaling  and the depot. The whole first phase costs NT$12.8 billion. Work began in September 2014 and as of May 2016 is approximately one-third complete. With the opening of the Green Mountain Line, the first phase of the Danhai light rail is almost completed. The other three stations along the Blue Coast Line will be completed later.

The second phase completes the remaining  and six more stations of the Blue Coast Line. Its planned completion is in 2024.

The line is being developed by China Steel Corporation and subsidiaries United Steel Engineering & Construction Corporation and Taiwan Rolling Stock Company. Other contractors are Thales Rail Signalling Solutions for signalling, communications, and control equipment, CTCI Corporation for track work, Pandrol for track, maintenance, and safety equipment, TÜV Rheinland for testing, and ABB for electrical equipment.

Extension
The Danjiang Bridge over the mouth of the Tamsui River on the Taiwan strait is under construction to accommodate an extension of the Danhai LRT over the river to connect the town of Bali.

See also
 Rail transport in Taiwan
 List of railway stations in Taiwan
 Ankeng light rail
 Circular light rail
 Sanying line

External links

References

 
Railway lines opened in 2018